Michael John Rogers is a Canadian film and tv actor, known for his award winning lead role as Barry Nyle in the film Beyond the Black Rainbow and has frequently collaborated with director Neill Blomkamp. He is also quite well known in Indie film circles and received rave reviews from Glenn Kenny at the NY Times for his portrayal of ‘Mom’ in the Matt Porterfield film Sollers Point.

Filmography

Film

Television

Web

Awards and nominations

Awards

•2013 Vancouver Film Critics Circle Awards for Best Actor in a Canadian Film - Beyond the Black Rainbow

Nominations

•2012 New York Film Poll for Best Supporting Actor - Beyond the Black Rainbow

References

External links

Living people
Canadian male film actors
Canadian male television actors
Male actors from Vancouver
Male actors from Victoria, British Columbia
Yale School of Drama alumni
Year of birth missing (living people)